Roberto Ismael Torres Báez (born 6 April 1972) is a Paraguayan football manager and former player who played as a midfielder. He is the current manager of Guaireña.

Torres has played for Paraguay national team.

Coaching career
On 19 February 2019, Torres was appointed as manager of Sportivo Luqueño.

Career statistics

Club

International
Source:

References

External links

1972 births
Living people
Association football midfielders
Paraguayan footballers
Paraguay international footballers
Paraguayan expatriate footballers
Paraguayan Primera División players
J1 League players
Cerro Porteño players
O'Higgins F.C. footballers
Júbilo Iwata players
Expatriate footballers in Japan
Expatriate footballers in Chile
Cerro Porteño managers
Paraguayan football managers
Resistencia S.C. managers
Club Nacional managers
Sportivo Luqueño managers
Guaireña F.C. managers